Acanthosaura aurantiacrista is a species of agama found in Thailand.

References

aurantiacrista
Reptiles of Thailand
Reptiles described in 2020